The British Poet Laureate is an honorary position appointed by the monarch of the United Kingdom, currently on the advice of the prime minister. The role does not entail any specific duties, but there is an expectation that the holder will write verse for significant national occasions. The origins of the laureateship date back to 1616 when a pension was provided to Ben Jonson, but the first official holder of the position was John Dryden, appointed in 1668 by Charles II. On the death of Alfred, Lord Tennyson, who held the post between November 1850 and October 1892, there was a break of four years as a mark of respect; Tennyson's laureate poems "Ode on the Death of the Duke of Wellington" and "The Charge of the Light Brigade" were particularly cherished by the Victorian public. Three poets, Thomas Gray, Samuel Rogers and Walter Scott, turned down the laureateship. The holder of the position as at January 2023 is Simon Armitage who succeeded Carol Ann Duffy in May 2019 after 10 years in office.

Background
The origins of the poet laureateship date back to 1616 when James I of England granted a pension to the writer Ben Jonson. Although there were subsequent court poets it was not until 1668, and the appointment of John Dryden by Charles II, that the post was made an established royal office within the royal household. Dryden, who had been appointed following the success of his 1667 poem Annus Mirabilis, was dismissed from office in 1689 following the accession of the Protestant William III and Mary II to the throne. Dryden, a Catholic convert, refused to take the Oath of Allegiance to the new monarchs and he was dismissed from the laureateship—the only holder to have been removed from office.

Dryden's successor, Thomas Shadwell, was appointed in 1689 for life. He introduced the custom of producing poems for the new year and the monarch's birthday, which became one of the key duties of the position. After the appointment of William Wordsworth in 1843 the duties settled into an expectation, not requirement, for major court and national occasions. Alfred, Lord Tennyson held the post between November 1850 and October 1892. According to Andrew Motion and Hilary Laurie, Tennyson "gave the poet laureateship new status and significance" with works such as "Ode on the Death of the Duke of Wellington" and "The Charge of the Light Brigade". On his death the post was left vacant as a mark of respect; a new laureate was not appointed until four years later, with the appointment of Alfred Austin in January 1896. As of 2015, the position is an honorary one, and the office holder is left to decide on which occasions they will produce poetry. Following Dryden's dismissal from the post, the laureateship was held for life by all successors until Motion was appointed in 1999 for a fixed term of ten years; his successor, Carol Ann Duffy, was also appointed on the same fixed term. Duffy was the first female poet to hold the role, and the first Scot.

After Shadwell's selection the laureate was appointed by the Lord Chamberlain, on the monarch's instructions. Since the appointment of Henry James Pye in 1790, the prime minister has recommended which candidate to appoint. For the appointment of Duffy the Department for Culture, Media and Sport (DCMS) undertook a consultation of academics and literary organisations to draw up a short list of recommendations which they presented to the prime minister. He, in conjunction with the Cabinet Office, then submitted the name to the Queen for approval.

Dryden's salary for the laureateship was £200 per year. In 1630 Charles I added an annual "butt of Canary wine", although this was later discontinued in place of the monetary equivalent. When Ted Hughes was appointed, he rekindled the tradition, and received 720 bottles of sherry; as at 2015 this practice continues. Since Motion's appointment the DCMS provided an annual honorarium of £5,750; Motion also received an additional £19,000 for his work in education. With Duffy's appointment, the salary returned to £5,750 and the barrel of sherry.

Poets laureate

See also
Children's Laureate

Notes and references

Notes

References

Sources

 
 
 
 
 

 
British poetry awards
1668 establishments in England
Poet Laureate
United Kingdom